Hydroxyl aluminium bis(2-ethylhexanoate) is a chemical substance derived from 2-ethylhexanoic acid and aluminium(III).  Nominally it is the coordination complex with the formula Al(OH)(O2CCHEt(CH2)3CH3)2 where Et = ethyl. The composition is not a homogeneous compound.  It is used as a thickening agent in various products, including in napalm. It is slightly hygroscopic.

References

Aluminium compounds
Ethylhexanoates